Events in the year 1972 in Bulgaria.

Incumbents 

 General Secretaries of the Bulgarian Communist Party: Todor Zhivkov
 Chairmen of the Council of Ministers: Stanko Todorov

Events

Sports 

 The 1972 European Women Basketball Championship, commonly called EuroBasket Women 1972, was held in Bulgaria. The Soviet Union won the gold medal, Bulgaria won the silver medal, and Czechoslovakia won the bronze medal.

References 

 
1970s in Bulgaria
Years of the 20th century in Bulgaria
Bulgaria
Bulgaria